Antarctic...huh? is a yet to be released episodic comedy created by Matt Hoyt with art direction and production design by artist Jason Sherry. An early draft of the project premiered at the Museum of Contemporary Art San Diego in La Jolla in June 2010.

The original score is primarily composed by Matt Hoyt and Joe Plummer, with help from friends Casey Butler, Pat Cummings, and Trevor Boyer.

References 

American comedy